Terra de Miranda ("Land of Miranda") (Tierra de Miranda in Mirandese, Terras de Miranda in Portuguese) is the historical name of a 500 km² mesa in northeastern Portugal, lying on the border of Spain. It used to be an administrative division, and although it does not correspond to a modern-day region's borders, there are some cultural characteristics particular to Terra de Miranda that keep the name in use to the present day.

It has been a border region between different administrative areas of the Roman Empire, the kingdoms of the Visigoths and the Suevi, the Arabs and the Christians. Although the etymology of the word Miranda is still debated, it is believed to mean "border".

Among the best known cultural features of the area are the Mirandese language, the Pauliteiros, the pagan rituals practiced from Christmas to Easter, the farandulo, and bagpipe music.

See also
 Miranda do Douro

External links 
Map of the Terra de Miranda
Mirandes na net. Lhengua i Cultura Mirandesa
Ethnologue report for Miranda do Douro (Mirandese) 

Former subdivisions of Portugal
Cultural history of Portugal
Mirandese language